Gymnopilus spinulifer is a species of mushroom in the family Hymenogastraceae.

See also

List of Gymnopilus species

External links
Gymnopilus spinulifer at Index Fungorum

spinulifer
Taxa named by William Alphonso Murrill